Carefree is a 1938 musical film starring Fred Astaire and Ginger Rogers. With a plot similar to screwball comedies of the period, Carefree is the shortest of the Astaire-Rogers films, featuring only four musical numbers. Carefree is often remembered as the film in which Astaire and Rogers shared a long on-screen kiss at the conclusion of their dance to "I Used to Be Color Blind," all previous kisses having been either quick pecks or simply implied.

Carefree was a reunion for the team of Astaire and Rogers after a brief hiatus following Shall We Dance and six other previous RKO pictures. The next film in the series, The Story of Vernon and Irene Castle (1939), would be their final RKO film together, although they would reunite in 1949 for MGM's The Barkleys of Broadway.

Plot
Psychiatrist Dr. Tony Flagg (Fred Astaire) does his friend Stephen Arden (Ralph Bellamy) a favor by taking on his fiancée, Amanda Cooper (Ginger Rogers), as a patient. Amanda, a radio singer, can't seem to make a decision about Stephen's many proposals of marriage, so Tony probes her subconscious mind to interpret her dreams. When Amanda dreams of dancing with her doctor, she's convinced that she's in love and to avoid telling Tony about the dream, makes up a wild dream. This leads Tony to believe that Amanda has serious psychiatric problems and he anesthetizes her to act on her subconscious impulses. By some chance, Stephen comes by, not knowing that she's under the influence of the anesthetic and Amanda is crazy in public, destroying property and kicking a cop. The next day, there is a party and Amanda gets Tony to dance (the Yam) with her and in the process of trying to tell Stephen that she's in love with her doctor, Stephen thinks that she's saying that she's in love with him. Amanda then dances with Tony, telling him that "something terrible has happened, and you're mixed up in it." Tony hypnotizes Amanda, saying that Tony does not love her and that "men like him should be shot down like dogs." Tony, while Amanda is still in a trance, realizes that he's in love with her, but while he is talking to himself in another room, Amanda has gotten out again. She finds Stephen at the country club, using a shotgun at targets. She takes one and starts shooting at Tony, who arrived desperately trying to undo what he has done. Stephen accuses him of trying to take his fiancée away. At Amanda and Stephen's wedding day, Tony sneaks in and wants to punch Amanda so that she is unconscious and he can hypnotize her but can't bring himself to do it. Stephen barges in, aims a punch at Tony but smacks Amanda unconscious instead. Tony then tells Amanda that he loves her, and they get married.

Cast
 Fred Astaire as Tony Flagg
 Ginger Rogers as Amanda Cooper
 Ralph Bellamy as Stephen Arden
 Luella Gear as Aunt Cora
 Jack Carson as Thomas Connors
 Clarence Kolb as Judge Joe Travers
 Franklin Pangborn as Roland Hunter
 Walter Kingsford as Dr. Powers
 Kay Sutton as Miss Adams
 James Finlayson (uncredited) as Man on golf course

Cast notes
 Hattie McDaniel appears briefly as a maid named "Hattie"
 RKO borrowed Ralph Bellamy from Columbia Pictures for this film.

Production
Carefree was in production from 14 to 15 April 1938 (Astaire's golfing dance) and from 9 May to 21 July. Location filming was done at Busch Gardens in Pasadena, California, and at the Columbia Ranch.

The "I Used to Be Color Blind" number was planned to be a Technicolor sequence in an otherwise black-and-white film. The film as released is entirely black-and-white.

Astaire didn't like "mushy love scenes," and preferred that lovemaking between him and Rogers be confined to their dances. Because rumors sprang up that Astaire's wife wouldn't let him kiss onscreen, or that Rogers and Astaire didn't like each other, Astaire agreed to the long kiss at the end of "I Used to Be Color Blind", "to make up for all the kisses I had not given Ginger for all those years."

Besides the number "Let's Make the Most of Our Dream," another scene that was dropped from the released film was one where Astaire tries to analyze a scatter-brained patient, played by Grace Hayle.

The film was released on 2 September 1938. The previous Astaire-Rogers film, Shall We Dance, had been released in May 1937, and the 16-month gap between the films was the longest between Astaire-Rogers films to that date.

Songs
The songs in Carefree were all written by Irving Berlin, and except for "Change Partners," which he had written for Astaire and Rogers years before, he wrote them all over the course of a few days, while on vacation in Phoenix, Arizona. An army of uncredited orchestrators contributed to the catchy settings of the tunes, principally among them Broadway's Robert Russell Bennett and future MGM stalwart Conrad Salinger.

As usual, Astaire created the choreography, with the help of his principal collaborator Hermes Pan. In preparation for The Story of Vernon and Irene Castle, the Astaire-Rogers film which was already scheduled to follow Carefree, the choreography for this film contains more lifts than usual.

 "Since They Turned 'Loch Lomond' into Swing" – Fred Astaire came up with the idea of hitting golf balls for this number, and spent two weeks rehearsing it. It was shot three weeks before the rest of the film, with Astaire performing to a piano track – the orchestrated arrangement was added later. Because of the difficulty of the action, the performance was pieced together from multiple takes, which was very unusual for Astaire, who preferred his dance numbers to be made from a minimum number of long takes.
 "I Used to Be Color Blind" – The dance for this number was shot at four times normal speed to create the slow-motion effect seen when the film is shown at normal speed.
 "The Night Is Filled With Music" (instrumental) – RKO had hired Ray Hendricks to sing this song, but it was dropped from the production and survived only as an instrumental.
 "The Yam" – Fred Astaire reportedly thought this song was silly, and refused to sing it, which is why Ginger Rogers sings it alone – although they do dance together after the vocal section. Eventually he made a record of it, which can be heard in his collected works.
 "Change Partners" – The only song from this film which had an afterlife, "Change Partners" was nominated for an Academy Award.

Reception

Critical
Carefree received generally mixed reviews when it was released, although the critic for the Motion Picture Herald, William R. Weaver, called it "the greatest Astaire-Rogers picture."

Box office
The film earned $1,113,000 in the US and Canada and $618,000 elsewhere, but according to RKO records still lost the studio $68,000. It was the first Astaire and Rogers films not to show a profit upon its original release.

Awards
Carefree was nominated for three Academy Awards: Best Art Direction (Van Nest Polglase), Best Musical Scoring (Victor Baravalle) and Best Song "Change Partners", 
written by Irving Berlin.

References

External links
 
 
 
 
 
 Fred & Ginger

1938 films
1938 musical films
American black-and-white films
Films directed by Mark Sandrich
RKO Pictures films
Films with screenplays by Dudley Nichols
Psychotherapy in fiction
Films scored by Irving Berlin
American musical films
1930s English-language films
1930s American films